Ne budi me bez razloga  (Serbian Cyrillic: Не буди ме без разлога, trans. Don't Wake Me Up Without a Good Reason) is an EP from Serbian and former Yugoslav rock musician Rajko Kojić. It is Rajko Kojić's only solo release.

The EP was released in 1983, while Rajko Kojić was a member of the band Riblja Čorba. The EP features two Riblja Čorba members as guests: Bora Đorđević on vocals and Vladimir Golubović on drums.

The album cover was designed by Jugoslav Vlahović. Rajko Kojić's name was written with the same font and features the same stylized fish bone as Riblja Čorba logo.

Track listing
The music for all four songs was written by Kojić. The lyrics for the first three tracks were written by Bora Đorđević, and for the fourth by Momčilo Bajagić.
"Lažeš" – 3:45
"Ne budi me bez razloga" – 3:41
"I to sve iz ljubavi" – 3:14
"Grešnik pod nebeskom kapom" – 3:40

Personnel
Rajko Kojić - guitar
Bora Đorđević - vocals
Neša Japanac - bass guitar
Laza Ristovski - piano, keyboard
Vladimir Golubović - drums

Rajko Kojić albums
1983 EPs
PGP-RTB EPs